Vaivadiškiai is a village in the Jonava district municipality, in Kaunas County, in central Lithuania. According to the 2011 census, the village has a population of 167 people.

References

Villages in Jonava District Municipality